Eduardo Kac ;  (born 1962) is a contemporary artist of dual nationality (American and Brazilian) whose artworks span a wide range of practices, including performance art, poetry, holography, interactive art, digital and online art, and bio art. He is particularly well known for his works of space art.

Kac began his art career in 1980 as a performance artist in Rio de Janeiro, Brazil. In 1982 he created his first digital work and in 1983 he invented holopoetry, exploring holography as an interactive art form. In 1985 he began creating animated poetic works on the French Minitel platform.

Throughout the 1980s Kac created telecommunications artworks, using media such as fax, television, and slow scan TV. In 1986 Kac created his first work of telepresence art, in which he used robots to bridge two or more physical locations. During the 1990s he continued to produce these works, expanding his practice with works of interspecies communications. In 1997 he coined the phrase bio art. Throughout his career, Kac has coined numerous neologisms to describe his transdisciplinary art practice, including biorobotics (functional merger of robotics and biotechnology), plantimal (plant with animal genetic material or animal with plant genetic material), and transgenic art (the expression of genes from one species in another in an artwork).

Kac is well known for his transgenic artworks that use biotechnology to create plants and animals with new genetic characteristics. His works Time Capsule (1997), Genesis (1999), GFP Bunny (2000) and Natural History of the Enigma (2003-2009), in particular, are recognized as notable works for having joined biotechnology, art and bioethics together into artworks that are at once political and philosophical.

In 2017 Kac created Inner Telescope, an artwork conceived for zero gravity and made aboard the International Space Station. Kac worked with the French Space Observatory office, from the French Space Agency, to have this work made in space by the astronaut Thomas Pesquet.

Since 2019, Kac has been developing Adsum, an artwork for the Moon. Conceived in five phases, as of 2022 Kac had completed the first three parts. "Adsum" is a glass artwork with four visual symbols internally laser-engraved in three dimensions and is meant to exist in the lunar environment.

A multidisciplinary artist, Kac has also employed poetry, fax, photocopying, photography, video, fractals, RFID implants, virtual reality, networks, robotics, satellites, telerobotics, Morse code and DNA extraction in his practice.

Life
Kac was born July 3, 1962, in Rio de Janeiro, Brazil. He studied at the School of Communications of the Pontifical Catholic University of Rio de Janeiro, receiving a BA degree in 1985, and then at the School of the Art Institute of Chicago where he received an MFA degree in 1990. In 2003 he received a doctorate from the Planetary Collegium at the University of Wales, Great Britain. Kac is a professor of art at the School of the Art Institute of Chicago.

Art career

1980s 

In 1980 Kac launched the Movimento de Arte Pornô (Porn Art Movement) on Ipanema Beach, in Rio de Janeiro, with the stated goal of subverting the logic of normative pornography at the service of activism and imagination. Working under the extremely conservative political climate of Brazil under a military dictatorship, Kac and other Movement members, such as Glauco Mattoso, Leila Míccolis, and Hudinilson Jr., developed the new body-centered aesthetics collectively until 1982. Kac was also a performer with the Gang, the performance unit of the Movimento de Arte Pornô; the Gang performed in São Paulo, Rio de Janeiro, and other cities.

Beginning in 1982, Kac started to create digital works. In 1983 Kac invented holographic poetry (which he also called holopoetry), the first of which was HOLO/OLHO, named after the Portuguese word for "eye". 24 holographic poems followed this first work, including Quando? (When?) (1987), a cylindrical work that could be read in two directions.

Around the same time, and drawing on his interest in experimental poetry forms, Kac began making animated poetry works with the French Minitel system that was then in use in Brazil. In 1985 he contributed one such work, Reabracadabra, to the Arte On Line exhibition, organized by the Livraria Nobel bookstore in São Paulo. Other Minitel animated poems by Kac include Recaos (1986), Tesão (1985/86) and D/eu/s (1986). In 1986, with Flavio Ferraz, Kac organized the Brasil High-Tech exhibition at the Galeria de Arte Centro Empresarial Rio in Rio de Janeiro.

From 1985 to as late as 1994, Kac did a number of telecommunications artworks that used Slow-scan television (SSTV), FAX, and live television, to create interactive exchanges between separate locations.

In 1986 Kac created his first telepresence artwork, using a robot to connect distant audiences. In 1988 he began work on his Ornitorrinco project, a telepresence artwork completed in Chicago, in 1989, in collaboration with Ed Bennett. The work brought together robotics, telecommunications technologies and interactivity to create a robot that was controlled remotely. The piece allowed viewers in one location to control the robot's camera and motion, creating a telepresent work and effecting the experience of viewers in the other location.

In 1989 Kac moved from Brazil to Chicago, where he would complete his MFA at the Art Institute of Chicago the following year.

1990s 
In the 1990s, Kac continued creating telematic works, with Dialogical Drawing (1994) and Essay Concerning Human Understanding (1994) both using networks to explore the viewer experience of an artwork mediated between two sites in real time. In the latter case, the artwork joined a plant in New York city and a live canary in Kentucky in conversation. The inclusion of a bird and a plant as part of an interactive system is an early example of what Kac called interspecies communications.

In 1996, Kac's space artwork Monogram was included in the DVD that flew to Saturn mounted to the side of the Cassini spacecraft.

In Teleporting An Unknown State (1994), Kac built a system that allowed a plant to survive in a gallery, illuminated not by direct sunlight but by the action of local or remote viewers of the work. In practice, local or remote viewers of the work selected from a set of webcams facing the sky of distant cities. A video projector above the plant relayed the webcam images to the plant, thus enabling it to do photosynthesis with light transmitted remotely. As a result, the system transmitted light values (frequency and amplitude) from distant skies to a local plant.

Notably, Kac coined the term "bio art" with his 1997 performance work Time Capsule. In Time Capsule, Kac implanted himself with an RFID chip originally designed for use in pets. A participant in Chicago then triggered the RFID scanned in the Brazilian gallery where Kac was performing, causing the scanner to display a unique code for the implant. Kac then registered himself on the pet database associated with the implant, becoming the first human to do so. Time Capsule was simultaneously live on television and the Internet.

By the late 90s Kac defined himself either as a "transgenic artist" or a "bio artist", and was using biotechnology and genetics to create provocative works that concomitantly explore scientific techniques and critique them.

Kac's next transgenic artwork, created in 1998/99 and titled Genesis, involved him taking a quote from the Bible (Genesis 1:26 – "Let man have dominion over the fish of the sea, and over the fowl of the air, and over every living thing that moves upon the earth"), transferring it into Morse code, and finally, translating that Morse code (by a conversion principle specially developed by the artist for this work) into the base pairs of genetics. The new DNA sequence was introduced into bacteria.

Participants were then able to shine ultraviolet lights onto the bacteria containing the new DNA, thus altering it. So when Kac translated it back to English, it said something completely different. Through this work, Kac encourages audiences to consider the new interconnectedness between biology, technology, and meaning.

2000s
In one of his best known works, GFP Bunny, presented in 2000 in Avignon, France, Kac commissioned a French laboratory to create a green-fluorescent rabbit; a rabbit born with a Green Fluorescent Protein (GFP) gene from a type of jellyfish. Kac named the rabbit Alba. Under a specific blue light, the rabbit fluoresces green. GFP Bunny proved to be hugely controversial, in part due to the unprecedented nature of the artwork, in part because of the general lack of familiarity with the safety of the process at the close of the twentieth century. The safety of the process was evidenced by the award of the Nobel Prize, in 2008, to the inventors of the GFP technique. The cultural contribution made by GFP Bunny was acknowledged by one of the scientists in his Nobel Lecture on December 8, 2008.

Kac's original aim was for Alba to live with his family, but prior to the scheduled release of Alba to Kac, the lab retracted their agreement and decided that Alba should remain in the lab. Kac responded by creating a series of works that called for her freedom. Other works would follow, focused on celebrating her life.

As familiarity with bio art, in particular, and biotechnology, in general, increased in the first twenty years of the twentieth century, GFP Bunny ceased to be controversial and gained significant presence in popular culture, appearing in franchises such Big Bang Theory, Sherlock, and Simpsons, and in novels such as Oryx and Crake, by Margaret Atwood, and Next, by Michael Crichton.

His work Natural History of the Enigma (2003–2008) continued in the theme of bio art by merging his DNA with that of a petunia, creating a hybrid organism that Kac called a plantimal. The plant, also given the name Edunia (from Eduardo and Petunia), mimicked the flow of blood through human veins by mixing Kac's DNA only with the plant's genetic components that made the veins in its leaves red.

Kac's bio art has been celebrated by contemporary at critics and historians. Frank Popper called it "revolutionary" and Didier Ottinger wrote that "the fluorescent rabbit poses questions that lead toward a redefinition of our aesthetic notions and criteria". Christiane Paul stated that "Kac's approach recalls that of Renaissance artists such as Raphael and Leonardo da Vinci, who were fascinated equally by the universal laws of science and the universal truths of art." Eleanor Heartney wrote that in Kac's transgenic art "advances in bio-engineering and genome research are applied to living entities in ways that raise philosophical questions about the ethics of science and the human potential to alter the basis of natural law".

2010s
In 2017 Kac collaborated with French astronaut Thomas Pesquet to create an artwork in space called Inner Telescope. Following Kac's instructions, Pesquet cut and folded two pieces of paper into a sculptural form. Floating in zero gravity, the form could be read as the three letters forming the French word for me, M-O-I, or a stylized human figure with the umbilical cord cut.

2020s
Since 2019, Kac has been developing Adsum, an artwork for the Moon. Conceived in five phases, as of 2022 Kac had completed the first three milestones. Adsum is a glass artwork with four visual symbols internally laser-engraved in three dimensions and is meant to exist in the lunar environment. The four symbols that constitute the work are: an hourglass (representing time at a human scale), two circles (one large, representing the Earth; one small, representing the Moon), and the infinity symbol (representing time at a cosmic scale).

Permanent collections
Kac's work is included in the permanent collections of the Museum of Modern Art, New York, Tate Modern, London, Institut Valencià d'Art Modern in Valencia, Spain, Reina Sophia Museum, Madrid, Spain, Les Abattoirs Toulouse, France, and the Victoria and Albert Museum, London. Several of Kac's artist's books are included in the library of the Metropolitan Museum of Art, New York.

Awards
In 1998 he received the Leonardo Award for Excellence from ISAST. In 1999, he received the Inter Communication Center (Tokyo) Biennial Award in 1999.

In 2002 he received the Creative Capital Award in the discipline of Emerging Fields.

In 2008 he received the Golden Nica award at Ars Electronica for his project Natural History of the Enigma.

Bibliography
Books by Eduardo Kac

 Luz & Letra: Ensaios De Arte, Literatura E Comunicação [Light & Letter: Essays on Art, Literature and Communication]. Rio de Janeiro: Contra Capa, 2004.
 Telepresence & Bio Art: Networking Humans, Rabbits, & Robots, Foreword James Elkins. Ann Arbor, Michigan: University of Michigan Press, 2005.
 Signs of Life: Bio Art and Beyond, MIT Press, Cambridge, 2007, 
 Media Poetry: an International Anthology (2nd edition), Bristol, United Kingdom, Intellect Books, 2007.

Catalogues and monographs of Eduardo Kac's exhibitions

 Eduardo Kac. Published on the occasion of Kac's mid-career survey, curated by Ángel Kalenberg. Valencia, Spain: Instituto Valenciano de Arte Moderno (IVAM) (in Spanish, English and Valencian), 2007. [Texts by Consuelo Císcar Casabán, Ángel Kalenberg, Didier Ottinger, Eleanor Heartney, Steve Tomasula, Gunalan Nadaranjan, Annick Bureaud, Eduardo Kac, Santiago Grisolía. Also includes a Critical Anthology, Chronology, and Bibliography]
 Kac, Eduardo. Hodibis Potax: Poetry Anthology [Oeuvres poétiques]. Ivry-sur-Seine, France: Édition Action Poétique (in French and English), 2007. [Published on the occasion of the solo exhibition Hodibis Potax, by Eduardo Kac, realized in the context of Biennale des Poètes en Val-de-Marne (Poetry Biennial, France), May 2007.]
 Eduardo Kac: Histoire Naturelle de L'Enigma et Autres Travaux / Eduardo Kac: Natural History of the Enigma and Other Works. Poitiers, France: Al Dante Éditions (in French and English), 2009. ["Ouvrage conçu & par les éditions Al Dante à l'occasion de l'exposition énonyme au centre d'art comtemporain Rurart... en partenariat avec l'espace Mendes France (centre de culture scientifique) de 8 octobre au 20 decembre 2009." / "Book edition designed by Al Dante on the occasion of the eponymous exhibition at Rurart Contemporary Art Center ... in partnership with Espace Mendes France (Center of Science and Culture,) from October 8 to December 20, 2009."] Additional publication information quoted from the title page of this catalogue.

Books about the art of Eduardo Kac

 Rossi, Elena Giulia (ed.). "Eduardo Kac : Move 36". Filigranes Éditions, Paris (in French and English), 2005, .
 The Eighth Day: The Trangenic Art of Eduardo Kac, eds. Sheilah Britton and Dan Collins. Tempe, Arizona: The Institute for Studies in the Arts, Arizona State University, 2003. .
 Azoulay, Gérard (ed.). Télescope intérieur. Observatoire de l'espace/CNES (in French and English), 2021, .

References

External links 
 
 Al Jazeera English interview on YouTube 
 Eduardo Kac interview on Digitalarti Mag 

1962 births
Living people
Brazilian artists
BioArtists
New media artists
Conceptual artists
Electronic literature writers
Brazilian Jews